Ghina Salsabila (born March 23, 1997 in Bandung, Indonesia) is an Indonesian actress and model.

Filmography
Hafalan Shalat Delisa
Sang Martir
Honeymoon

Soaps
Awas Ada Sule
Get Married
Insya Allah Ada Jalan
Si Kabayan Anak Sekolah
Kambing Genit

References

1997 births
Living people
Indonesian film actresses
People from Bandung